Godara is a surname, prevalent in the Indian subcontinent.

Godara may refer to:
 Sunita Godara
 Sumit Godara
 Kiran Bishnoi Godara

References

Indian surnames